Mary Ann Bevan ( Webster; 20 December 187426 December 1933) was an English woman, who, after developing acromegaly, toured the sideshow circuit as "the ugliest woman in the world".

Early years
Mary Ann Webster was one of eight children born into a working-class family in Plaistow, East London. She later became a nurse. In 1902, she married Thomas Bevan with whom she had four children. Thomas Bevan died suddenly in 1914.

Sideshow career
Bevan started exhibiting the symptoms of acromegaly soon after she was married, around the age of 32. She began to suffer from abnormal growth and facial distortion, which led to her "homely" appearance, along with severe headaches and fading eyesight. After the death of her husband in 1914, she no longer had the income to support herself and her four children. Bevan decided to capitalize on her appearance and entered an "Ugliest Woman" contest which she won.

In 1920, she was hired by Sam Gumpertz to appear in Coney Island's Dreamland sideshow, a form of freak show, where she spent most of the remainder of her life. She also made appearances for the Ringling Brothers Circus until her death. She was interred at Brockley and Ladywell Cemeteries.

Legacy
In the early 2000s, Bevan's image was used on a birthday card in the United Kingdom made by Hallmark Cards. The card made reference to the dating show Blind Date. A complaint was made by a Dutch physician that it was disrespectful to a woman who had become deformed as the result of a disease. Hallmark agreed that it was inappropriate and stopped distribution of the card.

References

External links
 "Mary Ann Bevan, the world's ugliest woman", acromegaly at the Eugenics Archive
 Mary Ann Bevans [sic] – The Homeliest Woman in the World

1874 births
1933 deaths
Nurses from London
People from Plaistow, Newham
People with acromegaly
Sideshow performers